Ukri Uolevi Merikanto (March 20, 1950 – July 25, 2010) was a Finnish sculptor.

Biography
Ukri Merikanto was born on March 20, 1950, in Helsinki, Finland to composer Aarre Merikanto (1893–1958) and his second wife Evi Sylvia Merikanto (née Mähönen) (1910–1968). He had one younger brother, Pan Ylermi Merikanto (1951–2012) and two older half-sisters from his father's first marriage, Anna Marjatta Peltonen (née Merikanto) and Arma Kyllikki Tukia (née Merikanto).

Merikanto studied art and design at the Finnish Academy of Fine Arts in Helsinki from 1968 to 1971. From 1974 until 1979 Merikanto was employed as a teacher at the academy, where he molded plastic designs.

In most of Merikanto's works, he used stone as the material. He was a key name in Finnish modernist art. His three-dimensional works address issues such as the relationship between weight and weightlessness.

In 2009, Merikanto was awarded the Pro Finlandia Medal of the Order of the Lion of Finland.

Some of Merikanto's notable works include: 
 Teräspursi (1981–1982) 
 Barcarola (1991) 
 Sisääntulo (1994) 
 Lintukoto (1999) 
 Kaukomieli (2000), a memorial sculpture for Otto Manninen, placed in Anni Swan Park in central Kangasniemi, Finland 
 Con amore (2000) 
Merikanto died on July 25, 2010, in Helsinki. He is buried within the Hietaniemi Cemetery beside his father and his grandfather, Oskar Merikanto.

References

External links 
 

20th-century Finnish sculptors
21st-century Finnish sculptors
1950 births
Artists from Helsinki
2010 deaths
Burials at Hietaniemi Cemetery